Amir Agayev (born February 10, 1992) is an Israeli footballer who plays as an attacking midfielder for Liga Leumit club Bnei Yehuda.

Early and personal life
Agayev was born in Rishon LeZion, Israel, to a family of Mizrahi Jews (Azerbaijani-Jewish) descent.

He married his girlfriend Sivan Agayev in August 2015.

Club career
On 31 January 2019, Agayev signed a 1.5 year contract with Sumgayit FK.

On 14 August 2020, Agayev signed a 1+1 year contract with Atromitos.

On 13 September 2020, He made his debut in the Super League Greece for Atromitos match against Volos.

International career
He has been an Israel national youth between 2010–2011. He was part of the Israel under-21 between 2013–2014.

On 22 August 2020, Agayev was called up by the senior Azerbaijan national team for a training camp in its capital city of Baku.

References

External links
 

1992 births
Israeli Mizrahi Jews
Jewish footballers
Living people
Israeli footballers
Bnei Yehuda Tel Aviv F.C. players
AC Omonia players
Beitar Jerusalem F.C. players
Hapoel Tel Aviv F.C. players
Sumgayit FK players
Atromitos F.C. players
F.C. Ashdod players
Maccabi Bnei Reineh F.C. players
Israeli Premier League players
Liga Leumit players
Cypriot First Division players
Azerbaijan Premier League players
Super League Greece players
Expatriate footballers in Cyprus
Expatriate footballers in Greece
Israeli expatriate sportspeople in Cyprus
Israeli expatriate sportspeople in Greece
Footballers from Rishon LeZion
Israeli people of Azerbaijani-Jewish descent
Azerbaijani people of Jewish descent
Israel under-21 international footballers
Association football midfielders